Johannes "Jo" Kaiser (27 February 1936 in Jüngersdorf, Düren – 17 December 1996 in Zürich, Switzerland) was a West German athlete who competed mainly in the 400 metres. He committed suicide in 1996.

He competed for the United Team of Germany in the 1960 Summer Olympics held in Rome, Italy in the 4 x 400 metre relay where he won the silver medal with his team mates Joachim Reske, Manfred Kinder and Carl Kaufmann.

References

External links
 
 

1936 births
1996 suicides
German male sprinters
Olympic silver medalists for the United Team of Germany
Olympic silver medalists in athletics (track and field)
Olympic athletes of the United Team of Germany
Athletes (track and field) at the 1960 Summer Olympics
Medalists at the 1960 Summer Olympics
European Athletics Championships medalists
Suicides in Switzerland